Acanthoica quattrospina is a species of alga belonging to the family Rhabdosphaeraceae.

It has cosmopolitan distribution.

References

Haptophyte species